Nicholas Bensaja (born 7 June 1995) is an Italian footballer who plays as a midfielder for  club Imolese.

Club career
He made his Serie C debut for L'Aquila on 6 September 2015 in a game against Pistoiese.

On 17 September 2019, he signed with Viterbese.

On 11 August 2021, he joined Lucchese on a two-year contract. On 31 January 2022, Bensaja returned to Paganese on loan.

References

External links
 

1995 births
Living people
Footballers from Rome
Italian footballers
Association football midfielders
Serie C players
Serie D players
A.S. Roma players
S.S. Monopoli 1966 players
Civitanovese Calcio players
Delfino Pescara 1936 players
L'Aquila Calcio 1927 players
U.S. Catanzaro 1929 players
Paganese Calcio 1926 players
Imolese Calcio 1919 players
U.S. Viterbese 1908 players
S.S.D. Lucchese 1905 players